This list of Vogue Scandinavia cover models is a catalog of cover models who have appeared on the cover of Vogue Scandinavia, the Scandinavian edition of Vogue magazine, starting with the magazine's first issue in August 2021.

2021

2022

2023

References

External links 
 Vogue Scandinavia
 Vogue Scandinavia at Models.com

Scandinavia
Vogue